The Callaway C12 is a sports car, designed, developed and built by American manufacturer Callaway, between 1998 and 1999.

References

Grand tourer racing cars
Sports cars
Cars of the United States
Cars introduced in 1998